Shoubak is a municipality that lies at the northwestern edge of the Ma'an Governorate in Jordan. It had a population of 19,297. At one of the highest elevations above sea level in Jordan, this municipality is famous for apple and fruit farms. The Crusader castle Montreal is located in Shoubak.

History

Shoubak was first settled by the Edomites who had their capital in Busaira in neighboring Tafilah Governorate, in the second millennium BC. It was then settled by the Nabataeans in the first millennium BC.

Shoubak is known for its Crusader castle Montreal. Along with Petra and Aqaba, Shoubak forms the third head of this triangle that lies on the cross road between Syria, Saudi Arabia and Egypt. Its unique high elevation (1330 m above sea level) gave it a strategic importance.

The importance of Shoubak reached its peak after Baldwin I of Jerusalem took control of it, cutting the roots between Egypt and Syria, the Montreal castle was built on top of a hill there in 1115. Shoubak was then annexed to the Ayyubid dynasty by Saladin in 1187.

Shoubak became a nahia in 1894, and was administratively belonging to the then-Ottoman Kerak department. In 1973, it was ranked up to a qadaa. In the 31st Administrative Divisions System of 1995, Shoubak became a full department within Ma'an Governorate benefiting from the decentralization program.

The city of Shoubak revolted against the Ottomans in 1900 and in 1905.

During the Arab Revolt, T.E. Lawrence entered Shoubak in Feb. 1918, commenting, "We went over the ridge and down to the base of the shapely cone, whose mural crown was the ring-wall of the old castle of Monreale, very noble against the night sky."  Upon departure, he wrote, "...we skated timorously down the rapid path to the open plain across which still stretched the Roman road with its groups of fallen milestones, inscribed by famous emperors."

Geography

Shoubak is located at an area bordering Tafilah Governorate to the north and Aqaba Governorate to the west. It is administratively in Ma'an Governorate.
Due to its high elevation, Shoubak is famous for its cold freezing winters, and due to its location at the borders of the Arabian Desert, it has a dry summer season.

Climate
In Shoubak, there is a Warm-summer Mediterranean climate. Most rain falls in the winter. The Köppen-Geiger climate classification is Csb, but very close to Dsa and BSk. About  of precipitation falls annually.

Demographics
The national census of the year 2004 showed that the total population of Shoubak was 12,590 persons, of whom 5,666 are males (45%) and 6924 are females, constituting 55% of the total population. There were 1,663 households with an average of 5 persons/household. Almost the entire population is Muslim.

Economy

Agriculture forms the major source of income for Shoubak, followed by tourism. Benefiting from its high altitude of more than 1,300 m above sea level, the countryside of Shoubak extends to about 189 km2 of olive, vegetable and fruit farms, mainly apple farms surrounding and within the town of Shoubak, resulting in the city spanning a relatively large area. There are 129 honey bee farms in the town's countryside, making it a major producer of honey.

Education
The college of agriculture of Al-Balqa` Applied University is located in Shoubak. The Regional Center of Agricultural Research and Technology Transport is also located in Shoubak.

Notable people
 Eid Dahiyat, Minister of Education
 Taha Ali Al-Habahbeh, Minister of State.

References

External links
 Official website

Municipalities in Jordan
Populated places in Ma'an Governorate
1894 establishments in the Ottoman Empire